Vermont Route 118 (VT 118) is a state highway in the U.S. state of Vermont. The highway runs  from VT 100 in Eden north to VT 108 in Berkshire. VT 118 connects several towns in northern Lamoille County and eastern Franklin County, including the covered bridge–rich town of Montgomery. The town of Berkshire maintains the highway north of VT 105.

Route description
VT 118 begins at VT 100 in the town of Eden. The highway heads north along two-lane Belvidere Road, which crosses the Frying Pan River as the route follows the stream to its source, a mountain pass in which the highway intersects the Long Trail. VT 118 descends west to Belvidere Pond, one of the headwaters sources of the North Branch Lamoille River, and crosses the pond's outlet immediately before entering the town of Belvidere. The highway crosses Calavale Brook and the North Branch proper at the T-intersection of Belvidere Corners, where VT 109 continues west while VT 118 turns north. VT 118 follows the North Branch to its source and crosses the Lamoille–Franklin county line and enters the town of Montgomery just north of the source of the Trout River. The highway follows the river north, crosses Pacific Brook, and passes near the Hectorville Covered Bridge and the Hutchins Covered Bridge in the namesake hamlets.

VT 118 continues north to Montgomery Center, where the highway crosses the Trout River between its closely spaced junctions with the west end of VT 58 (Hazens Notch Road) and VT 242 (Mountain Road). The highway continues northwest through the river valley to the village of Montgomery, which contains the historic Montgomery House, St. Bartholomew's Episcopal Church, and the Fuller Covered Bridge. Leaving the village, VT 118 passes near the Comstock Covered Bridge and crosses the South Branch Trout River twice between a crossing of West Hill Brook. The highway passes the Longley Covered Bridge and then the Hopkins Covered Bridge while passing through the northeast corner of the town of Enosburg. VT 118 enters the town of Berkshire as Montgomery Road, which crosses the Trout River and then the Missisquoi River west of its confluence with the Trout River. At the north end of the bridge, the highway has a T-intersection with VT 105 in the village of East Berkshire.

VT 118 briefly runs concurrently with VT 105 before splitting northwest onto Berkshire Center Road, which immediately intersects the Missisquoi Valley Rail Trail. VT 118 heads northwest through the village of Berkshire Center, where the highway meets Water Tower Road and Richford Road. The highway crosses the Pike River and passes the historic West Berkshire School before reaching its northern terminus at VT 108 (West Berkshire Road). The town of Berkshire maintains the portion of VT 118 north of VT 105; the Vermont Agency of Transportation maintains the Eden–East Berkshire portion of the highway.

Major intersections

References

External links

118
Transportation in Lamoille County, Vermont
Transportation in Franklin County, Vermont
Eden, Vermont
Belvidere, Vermont
Montgomery, Vermont
Berkshire, Vermont